The 1915 Michigan Wolverines football team was an American football team that represented the University of Michigan as an independent during the 1915 college football season. In its 15th season under head coach was Fielding H. Yost the team compiled a 4–3–1 record and outscored opponents by a total of 130 to 81. After winning its first four games, the Wolverines lost three consecutive games.

Right guard William D. Cochran was the team captain.  Key players included left halfback John Maulbetsch, quarterback Lawrence Roehm, fullback Cedric C. Smith, center Walter Niemann, and guard Frank Millard. Maulbetch was selected as a first-team All-American by Tommy Clark and as a second-team player by Walter Eckersall and Monty. He also received the Heston-Schulz Trophy as the team's most valuable player.

Schedule

Roster

Letter winners

Reserves
 Leland Benton, Valparaiso, IN, started 3 games at end, 4 games at halfback
 Alan W. Boyd, Indianapolis, IN, started 1 game at guard
Harry L. Calvin, Jr., Detroit, MI, quarterback
Otto Eberwein, Ann Arbor, MI, started 2 games at halfback
Egmont Goetz Hildner, Ann Arbor, MI, started 2 games at end
Hepburn Ingham, Des Moines, IA, started 1 game at end
Hoyne Howe, Oak Park, IL, started 3 games center
Philip T. Raymond, Saginaw, MI, started 2 games at fullback
Lewis Reimann, Iron River, MI, started 1 game at tackle
James H. Sharpe, Sault Ste. Marie, MI, halfback
Harold M. Zeigler, Pueblo, CO, started 1 game at quarterback

Awards and honors
Captain: William D. Cochran
All-Americans: John Maulbetsch (Walter Eckersall, 2nd team; Monty, 2nd team; Tommy Clark, 1st team)
Heston-Schulz Trophy (team MVP): John Maulbetsch

Coaching staff
Head coach: Fielding H. Yost
Assistant coaches: Ernest Allmendinger (Second Assistant Coach), Prentiss Douglass, Ralph A. McGinnis (Third Assistant Coach), James Raynsford, Germany Schulz (First Assistant Coach)
Trainer: Stephen Farrell
Manager: Boyd M. Compton

References

External links
 1915 Football Team -- Bentley Historical Library, University of Michigan Athletics History
 1915–1916 Michigan Alumnus
 1916 Michiganensian - University of Michigan yearbook for the 1915–1916 academic year

Michigan
Michigan Wolverines football seasons
Michigan Wolverines football